Dragon ship or dragonship may refer to:

 Drekar, the dragon-prowed longships of the Vikings
 Dragonships, a fantasy novel series by Margaret Weis and Tracy Hickman
 Dragon boat, a traditional Chinese watercraft now used exclusively in racing
 SpaceX Dragon 2, the SpaceX Dragon 2 Crew Dragon variant